Commuter Husbands is a 1972 comedy film by noted British sexploitation director Derek Ford, and a semi sequel to his 1971 film Suburban Wives. The film was directed and written by Derek Ford, and stars Gabrielle Drake, Robin Bailey, and Claire Gordon.The film exists also in a version with hardcore inserts, but there is no suggestion that any of the credited cast performed hardcore.

Plot
The Story Teller (Drake) enters the Penthouse Club in London, which she declares is the "front line" in the battle of the sexes, proving "that man is the most dangerous animal of them all - excepting woman". She introduces six stories about wayward husbands.

Cast
 Gabrielle Drake as The Story Teller  
 Robin Bailey as Dennis  
 Heather Chasen as Wife
 Robin Culver as John Appleby  
 Brenda Peters as Lola  
 Claire Gordon as Carla Berlin  
 Jane Cardew as Secretary   
 Dick Haydon as Arthur Benbow 
 Dervis Ward as Arnold  
 Dorothea Phillips as Wife  
 Mike Britton as Peter Harris  
 Nicola Austin as Dream Girl  
 Timothy Parkes as Raymond Hardacre  
 Yokki Rhodes as Trudi 
 George Selway as Charlesworth

Soundtrack
"Man Is A Hunter" - Performed by Samantha Jones.

References

External links
 

1972 films
British sexploitation films
1970s English-language films
1970s sex comedy films
British sex comedy films
1972 comedy films
Films directed by Derek Ford
1970s British films